B. tricolor may refer to:

 Bedotia tricolor, a fish species endemic to Madagascar
 Bulbophyllum tricolor, an orchid species

See also
 Tricolor (disambiguation)